Sophie Achard (born 1977) is a French statistician and neuroscientist whose research concerns the statistics of the pattern of connectivity in the brain. She is a director of research for the French National Centre for Scientific Research (CNRS), affiliated with the French Institute for Research in Computer Science and Automation (Inria) laboratory at Grenoble Alpes University.

Education and career
Achard studied mathematics, statistics, and numerical analysis at Jean Monnet University, earning a bachelor's degree in 1999. She earned a master's degree through research on the statistics of mixture models at Joseph Fourier University in Grenoble 2000, and completed a Ph.D. there in 2003. Her doctoral dissertation, Mesures de dépendance pour la séparation aveugle de sources : application aux mélanges post non linéaires, was directed by Dinh-Tuan Pham and Christian Jutten.

After postdoctoral research in the Brain Mapping Unit at the University of Cambridge with Edward Bullmore from 2004 to 2007, she returned to Grenoble as a CNRS researcher in 2008, and was promoted to director of research in 2017.

Recognition
Achard received the CNRS Silver Medal in 2023.

References

External links
Home page

1977 births
Living people
French statisticians
Women statisticians
French neuroscientists
French women neuroscientists
Jean Monnet University alumni
Research directors of the French National Centre for Scientific Research